The Philippine trogon (Harpactes ardens) is a species of bird in the family Trogonidae. Primarily due to its plumage and colors, the bird has been associated with the mythical Ibong Adarna from Filipino epic poems. It is endemic to the Philippines.

Description
The males head and throat is black and its face is blue. The neck and mantle are brown, rump light brown with a rufous tail. The breast is light grey to pink, a red breast line and a paler red under pant. The females are duller in all colors.

Habitat
Its natural habitats are subtropical or tropical moist lowland forest and subtropical or tropical moist montane forest.

It is common in forest and secondary growth, and it is usually found alone or in pairs perched 5 to 10 m from the ground in a dark recess on a vine or branch in the understory.

Reproduction
It builds its nest in a hole in a dead tree 6 meters up. Its clutch size is 3 eggs.

Feeding
Not much is known, but, grasshoppers are plucked from branches.

References

Philippine trogon
Endemic birds of the Philippines
Philippine trogon
Taxonomy articles created by Polbot